TIMS is a four-letter combination that may refer to:

 Telecommunication Instructional Modeling System, aka Emona TIMS, an electronic device for telecommunications training
 The International Molinological Society
 Thermal ionization mass spectrometry
 Thermal infrared multispectral scanner; see Thermal infrared spectroscopy
 The Institute of Management Sciences
 Theoretical Intermarket Margin System a risk-based margin methodology used by the Options Clearing Corporation

See also
Timberland (company), whose boots are known as Tims
 Tim Hortons, a chain of coffeeshops in Canada